Euhyponomeutoides ribesiella is a moth of the family Yponomeutidae. It is found in Fennoscandia, Germany, Poland, Estonia, Ukraine, Slovakia, Austria, Belgium and France.

The wingspan is 16–19 mm. Adults are on wing from late April to September.

The larvae feed on Ribes alpinum and Ribes uva-crispa. They mine the leaves of their host plant. The mine has the form of a narrow corridor usually starting with a spiral. The frass is deposited in a central black line. Older larvae live freely under a spinning, causing window feeding. Larvae can be found from May to July.

References

Moths described in 1900
Yponomeutidae
Moths of Europe